Jennifer Rita Harris is an American politician and activist. She won the 2022 Florida House of Representatives election, District 44, defeating incumbent Daisy Morales. She has no general-election opponents.

Electoral history

2022 Democratic Primary Election

References

External links

Year of birth missing (living people)
Place of birth missing (living people)
Living people
21st-century American women politicians
Florida Democrats
Women in Florida politics
Activists from Florida
21st-century American politicians